Remix Stories Vol. 1 is an EP by Unkle. It was released exclusively on Beatport (for the first week after release) and Unkle's music store. The EP contains four unreleased remixes from the group's previous two albums at that time, War Stories and End Titles... Stories for Film. The vinyl release of the EP was a limited edition.

Track listing
 "Trouble in Paradise (Variation on a Theme)" [Unkle Surrender Sounds Session #11] – 7:26
 "Hold My Hand" (Innervisions Orchestra Remix) – 8:23
 "Twilight" (Layo & Bushwacka! Remix) – 9:07 (featuring 3D)
 "Chemistry" (Radio Slave Remix) – 13:24

Unkle albums
2008 EPs
2008 remix albums
Remix EPs